The Hardy Cemetery is a historic cemetery at 722 Arkansas Highway 225 East in Centerville, Faulkner County, Arkansas.  It is set on  fringed by cedar trees.  It consists of six barrel-vaulted tombs, all built to house members of the Hardy family, whose patriarch, Dr. Henry Baxton Hardy, was a prominent local doctor and politician.  Only three of the tombs are occupied, by Dr. Hardy, his wife Cora, and Marco, one of his seven children.  The others remained unoccupied due a rift in family relations.

The cemetery was listed on the National Register of Historic Places in 2009.

See also
 National Register of Historic Places listings in Faulkner County, Arkansas

References

External links
 

Cemeteries on the National Register of Historic Places in Arkansas
Buildings and structures completed in 1939
Buildings and structures in Faulkner County, Arkansas
National Register of Historic Places in Faulkner County, Arkansas
Cemeteries established in the 1930s